The 2021 Copa América was the 47th edition of the Copa América, the international men's football championship organised by South America's football ruling body CONMEBOL. The tournament took place in Brazil from 13 June to 10 July 2021. The tournament was originally scheduled to take place from 12 June to 12 July 2020 in Argentina and Colombia as the 2020 Copa América. On 17 March 2020, CONMEBOL announced that due to the COVID-19 pandemic in South America, the tournament had been postponed for a year, in conjunction with UEFA's decision to also postpone UEFA Euro 2020 to 2021. This was the first time since 1991 where no guest nation took part in the tournament.

On 20 May 2021, Colombia was removed as co-host amid ongoing protests against President Iván Duque Márquez, and Argentina was then removed on 30 May due to COVID-19 issues. The following day CONMEBOL confirmed Brazil as the new host of the tournament.

Hosts Brazil were the title holders, having won their ninth title in 2019, which they also hosted. Argentina won their fifteenth title after defeating Brazil 1–0 in the final, their first senior title since the 1993 edition of the same tournament. They also equalled Uruguay's overall record of Copa América titles.

Background
In March 2017, CONMEBOL reportedly proposed that the Copa América take place in 2020 as part of a calendar change. Following the 2019 edition in Brazil, the quadrennial tournament would move from odd to even years starting in 2020, with the following edition taking place in Ecuador in 2024. This would move the tournament in line with the UEFA European Championship, which is also held in even years with a 2020 edition taking place. Reports suggested that the United States may host the tournament, having previously held the one-off Copa América Centenario in 2016, which celebrated the centenary of CONMEBOL and the Copa América. On 18 September 2018, plans for a calendar change were confirmed by CONMEBOL president Alejandro Domínguez after submitting an official request to FIFA.

On 26 October 2018 at the FIFA Council meeting in Kigali, Rwanda, the request was approved for the Copa América to take place in even years, starting with the 2020 edition. The tournament was originally scheduled to take place between 12 June and 12 July 2020, the same dates as UEFA Euro 2020.

On 13 March 2019, CONMEBOL announced Argentina and Colombia as co-hosts of the 2020 event after the United States bid was rejected. It was officially announced the same day when CONMEBOL approved of the joint hosting. It was officially awarded on 9 April 2019 at the CONMEBOL Congress in Rio de Janeiro, Brazil.

On 20 May 2021, due to security concerns amid protests against the government of President Iván Duque Márquez, Colombia was dropped as co-host of the tournament.

Impact of the COVID-19 pandemic

In March 2020, the COVID-19 pandemic in South America began impacting football. FIFA announced that the first two rounds of the South American qualifiers for the 2022 World Cup, due to take place in March, were postponed, while CONMEBOL temporarily suspended the Copa Libertadores. On 17 March 2020, CONMEBOL announced that the Copa América would be postponed to the following year, taking place from 11 June to 11 July 2021, in order to protect the health and safety of the teams, media, visitors and host cities. On the following day, the Bureau of the FIFA Council approved the date change in the FIFA International Match Calendar. As a result, the expanded FIFA Club World Cup, which was due to take place in June and July 2020, was rescheduled to 2021.

On 22 May 2021, Argentina went under a nine-day lockdown due to soaring COVID-19 cases, which included the suspension of all domestic football. On 30 May 2021, CONMEBOL announced that due to the current circumstances in the country, Copa América would be pulled from Argentina, and that they were looking at bids from other countries to host the tournament. This reportedly included a bid from the United States, after that bid was initially rejected. It was reported that the Argentine government had made increasing demands for biosecurity protocols that CONMEBOL found unreasonable. On 31 May Brazil was confirmed as the new host.

All matches in the tournament were held behind closed doors, except the final, where 10% of Maracanã Stadium's capacity was allowed for guests with a negative COVID-19 test before entering. All delegations, each limited to 65 members, were vaccinated, as were the match officials.

Venues
On 1 June 2021, the Brazilian government and Brazilian Football Confederation announced the cities of Brasília, Goiânia, Cuiabá and Rio de Janeiro as the host venues of the competition, with the Maracanã, Mané Garrincha, Pantanal and the Olímpico stadiums used for matches. On 2 June, the CBF decided to use the Nilton Santos as the second stadium in Rio de Janeiro. The government also allocated resources in the federal budget to provide the necessary support for the CONMEBOL's tournament logistics and security. Mané Garrincha hosted the opening match on 13 June, and the final was held at the Maracanã on 10 July.

Original venues
On 20 November 2019, CONMEBOL published a document confirming eight venues, Estadio Mario Alberto Kempes in Córdoba, Estadio Malvinas Argentinas in Mendoza, Estadio Monumental in Buenos Aires and Estadio Ciudad de La Plata in La Plata for Argentina and Estadio Olímpico Pascual Guerrero in Cali, Estadio Atanasio Girardot in Medellín, Estadio Metropolitano Roberto Meléndez in Barranquilla and Estadio El Campín in Bogotá for Colombia. Moreover, Estadio San Juan del Bicentenario in San Juan and Estadio Hernán Ramírez Villegas in Pereira were also nominated but not confirmed, being finally dismissed.

On 3 December 2019, prior to the draw, it was known that Estadio Único in Santiago del Estero was included as one of the Argentine venues.

On 15 March 2021, the Estadio Ciudad de La Plata, La Plata venue was ruled out as a result of the schedule shortening.

Colombia would have hosted the North Zone group, while Argentina would have hosted the South Zone group. Each country would also have hosted two quarter-finals and one semi-final. The third place match and final would have been played in Colombia.

Teams
All ten CONMEBOL national teams participated in the competition, divided into two geographical zones for the group stage.

In June 2019, the CONMEBOL Council officially approved the participation of Australia and Qatar as the two invited teams, who were the previous two winners of the AFC Asian Cup. Australia would have made their debut appearance in the Copa América, while Qatar would be making their second appearance, having participated in the previous edition. However, on 23 February 2021, Football Australia and the Qatar Football Association announced their withdrawal from the tournament, due to the postponement of the remainder of the AFC second round of 2022 FIFA World Cup qualification to June 2021. Following the withdrawals, a CONMEBOL spokesperson said that there was a calendar issue that stopped Australia and Qatar, that he had already seen interest from other national teams to play as guests in their place and that he would like to have 12 teams. The spokesperson added that if no replacements were found, the tournament would be played with 10 teams (for the first time since 1991).

CONMEBOL North Zone
 (title holders and hosts)

CONMEBOL South Zone

Draw
The team allocations of the CONMEBOL members, divided into North Zone and South Zone, were announced on 9 April 2019. The group stage draw was held on 3 December 2019, 19:30 COT (UTC−5), in Cartagena. Original co-hosts Argentina and Colombia were automatically allocated to positions A1 and B1, respectively. After the draw, the zones for the two invited nations and the positions of teams within the groups were as follows:

On 2 June 2021, Argentina and Brazil were allocated to positions A1 and B1, respectively, in the competition calendar update.

Squads

Each team had to submit a list of up to 28 players (expanded from 23), including at least three goalkeepers.

Match officials
On 21 April 2021, CONMEBOL announced a total of 14 referees, 22 assistant referees, 16 video assistant referees (VAR), and 10 support referees appointed for the tournament. This edition featured the participation of a Spanish refereeing team as part of the memorandum of understanding signed by CONMEBOL and UEFA in February 2020, which included a referee exchange programme.

On 5 June 2021, Uruguayan video assistant referees Leodán González and Daniel Fedorczuk were replaced by Andrés Cunha, also from Uruguay. In addition, Juan Soto from Venezuela and Jhon Alexander León from Colombia replaced the video assistant referee Nicolás Gallo and the assistant referee Miguel Roldán respectively, both from Colombia. Nicolás Gallo and Miguel Roldán had previously been suspended indefinitely as a result of their performance in the match between Uruguay and Paraguay valid for the CONMEBOL World Cup qualifiers.

Later, Leodán González and Daniel Fedorczuk were summoned again to join the Uruguayan referee team.

Group stage
The original schedule and kick-off times for the tournament were announced on 3 December 2019 and 4 March 2020 respectively. On 17 March 2020, the tournament was postponed until 2021 and the new schedule was announced on 13 August 2020. Following the withdrawals of Qatar and Australia, the schedule was shortened and it was announced on 15 March 2021. The final match schedule with Brazil as host country was announced on 2 June 2021.

All match times listed are in BRT (UTC−3), as listed by CONMEBOL. Cuiabá is located in a different time zone, AMT (UTC−4), so the local time is also given.

The top four teams of each group advanced to the quarter-finals.

Tiebreakers
The ranking of teams in the group stage was determined as follows (Regulations Article 10.6):
 Points obtained in all group matches (three points for a win, one for a draw, none for a defeat);
 Goal difference in all group matches;
 Number of goals scored in all group matches;
 Points obtained in the matches played between the teams in question;
 Goal difference in the matches played between the teams in question;
 Number of goals scored in the matches played between the teams in question;
 Fair play points in all group matches (only one deduction could be applied to a player in a single match): 
 Drawing of lots.

Group A (South Zone)

Group B (North Zone)

Knockout stage

In the knockout stage, if a match was tied after 90 minutes:
In the quarter-finals, semi-finals, and third place play-off, extra time would not be played, and the match would be decided by a penalty shoot-out (Regulations Article 9.3).
In the final, extra time would be played. If still tied after extra time, the match would be decided by a penalty shoot-out (Regulations Article 9.4).

Bracket

Quarter-finals

Semi-finals

Third place play-off

Final

Statistics

Goalscorers

Awards
The following awards were given at the conclusion of the tournament.
 Best Player Award:  Lionel Messi
 Top Scorer Award:  Lionel Messi and  Luis Díaz (4 goals each)
 Best Goalkeeper Award:  Emiliano Martínez
 Fair Play Award:

Team of the Tournament 
The Team of the Tournament was selected at the conclusion of the competition.

Marketing

Mascot 

Pibe, a brown dog, was selected as the official mascot for the tournament, making it the 14th officially selected mascot in Copa América history.

Official song

A customized version of "La Gozadera" by Cuban duo Gente de Zona was revealed as the official song of the tournament, ahead of its official reveal on 11 May.

Broadcasting rights

CONMEBOL
Broadcasting rights for South America.

Rest of world

Notes

References

External links
 
 

 
2021
2021 in Brazilian football
2021 in South American football
International association football competitions hosted by Brazil
June 2021 sports events in Brazil
July 2021 sports events in Brazil
Association football events postponed due to the COVID-19 pandemic